This is a list of published works by writer and theologian Frederick Buechner.

Fiction 
A Long Day's Dying, 1950
The Seasons' Difference, 1952
The Return of Ansel Gibbs, 1958
The Final Beast, 1965
The Entrance to Porlock, 1970
The Book of Bebb (tetralogy), 1979
Lion Country, 1971
Open Heart, 1972
Love Feast, 1974
Treasure Hunt, 1977
Godric, 1980
Brendan, 1987
The Wizard's Tide: A Story, 1990 (later re-released as The Christmas Tide, 2005)
The Son of Laughter, 1993
On the Road with the Archangel, 1997
The Storm, 1998

Memoir 

 The Sacred Journey: A Memoir of Early Days, 1982
Now and Then: A Memoir of Vocation, 1983
 Telling Secrets: A Memoir, 1991
 The Eyes of the Heart: A Memoir of the Lost and Found, 1999

Nonfiction 
 The Magnificent Defeat, 1966
 The Hungering Dark, 1968
 The Alphabet of Grace, 1970
 Wishful Thinking: a seeker's ABC, 1973
 The Faces of Jesus: a life story, 1974
 Telling the Truth: the Gospel as tragedy, comedy, and fairy tale, 1977
 Peculiar Treasures: a Biblical who's who, 1979
 A Room Called Remember, 1984
 Whistling in the Dark: a doubter's dictionary, 1988
 The Clown in the Belfry: Writings on Faith and Fiction, 1992
 Listening to Your Life: Daily Meditations with Frederick Buechner, 1992
 The Longing for Home: Recollections and Reflections, 1996
 Speak What We Feel (Not What We Ought to Say): Reflections on Literature and Faith , 2001
 Beyond Words: Daily Readings in the ABC's of Faith, 2004
 Secrets in the Dark: a life in sermons, 2006
 The Yellow Leaves: A Miscellany, 2008
 Buechner 101: Essays and Sermons by Frederick Buechner, 2014
 The Remarkable Ordinary: How to Stop, Look, and Listen to Life, 2017
 A Crazy, Holy Grace: The Healing Power of Pain and Memory, 2017)

Poetry 
 Bred In The Bone: An Anthology, 1945 (student poems commemorating the end of WWII / Princeton University / 325 printed)
 The Fat Man's Prescriptions I-IX, 1947 (poetry)
 Family Scenes, 1974 (poetry)
 Follensby Pond, 1983 (poetry)
 Found, date unknown (poetry, Lecture To a Book Of The Month Club)

References

Secondary literature
 Marie-Helene Davies. Laughter in a Genevan Gown: The Works of Frederick Buechner 1970–1980. (1983)
 Marjorie Casebier McCoy. Frederick Buechner: Novelist and Theologian of the Lost and Found. (1988)
 Victoria S. Allen. Listening to Life: Psychology and Spirituality in the Writings of Frederick Buechner. (2002)
 Dale Brown. The Book of Buechner: A Journey Through His Writings. (2006)

Buechner, Frederick